Celaenorrhinus cordeironis is a species of butterfly in the family Hesperiidae. It is found in north-eastern Tanzania. The habitat consists of lowland forests up to altitudes of 300 meters on the East Usambara Mountains.

Adults have been recorded in July.

References

Endemic fauna of Tanzania
Butterflies described in 1992
cordeironis